Fishlock is the surname of the following people:
Jess Fishlock (born 1987), Welsh football midfielder and coach 
Laurie Fishlock (1907–1986), English cricketer 
Murray Fishlock (born 1973), English football player 
Trevor Fishlock (born 1941), English reporter, author and broadcaster

English-language surnames